Victor McCaffery (11 August 1918 – 4 August 2008) was an Australian cricketer. He played five first-class matches for New South Wales in 1938/39.

See also
 List of New South Wales representative cricketers

References

External links
 

1918 births
2008 deaths
Australian cricketers
New South Wales cricketers
People from Goulburn
Cricketers from New South Wales